Ernő or Erno is a Finnish and Hungarian masculine given name. Notable people with the name include:

Ernő Balogh (1897-1989), Hungarian pianist, composer, editor, and educator
Ernő Bánk (1883-1962), Hungarian painter and teacher
Ernő Béres (born 1928), Hungarian long-distance runner and Olympic competitor
Ernő Csíki (1875- 194?), Hungarian entomologist
Ernő Dohnányi (1877–1960), Hungarian conductor, composer, and pianist
Ernő Foerk (1868–1934), Hungarian architect
Ernő Garami (1876-1935), Hungarian politician
Ernő Gereben (1907–1988), Hungarian–born Swiss chess master
Ernő Gerő (1898–1980), Hungarian Communist Party politician
Ernő Goldfinger (1902–1987), Hungarian-born British architect and furniture designer
Ernő Gubányi (born 1950), Hungarian handball player and Olympic competitor
Ernő Hetényi (1912–1999), Hungarian tibetologist, scholar and Buddhist
Ernő Jendrassik (1858-1921), Hungarian physician and medical researcher
Ernő Kiss (1799-1849), Hungarian Army general
Ernő Koch (1898-1970), Hungarian-born American graphic artist
Ernő Kolczonay (1953–2009), Hungarian fencer and Olympic medalist
Ernő Kovács (born 1959), Hungarian mechanical technician and politician
Ernő Lendvai (1925–1993), Hungarian music theorist and mathematician
Ernő Mesterházy (born 1963), Hungarian politician
Ernő Mihályfi (1898-1972), Hungarian politician
Ernő Nagy (1898–1977), Hungarian fencer and Olympic medalist
Ernő Noskó (born 1945), Hungarian football player and Olympic medalist
Ernő Osvát (1877—1929), Hungarian writer and editor
Erno Paasilinna (1935—2000), Finnish writer and journalist
Ernő Pattantyús-Ábrahám (1882-1945), Hungarian journalist and writer
Ernő Poeltenberg (1808-1849), Hungarian army general
Ernö Rapée (1891–1945), Hungarian-born American symphonic conductor
Ernő Rubik (1910–1997), Hungarian aircraft designer
Ernő Rubik (born 1944), Hungarian inventor (Rubik's Cube, etc.), architect and professor of architecture
Ernő Solymosi (1940–2011), Hungarian football player and Olympic medalist
Ernő Söptei (1925-1999), Hungarian sprint canoer and Olympic competitor
Ernő Schubert (1881–1931), Hungarian track and field athlete and Olympic competitor
Ernő Schwarz (1902-1977), Hungarian-born American soccer player, coach and promoter
Erno Vuorinen (Emppu Vuorinen) (born 1978), Finnish guitarist
Ernő Winter (1897–1971), Hungarian engineer and inventor

Finnish masculine given names
Hungarian masculine given names